Horizon School Division No. 67 or Horizon School Division is a public school authority within the Canadian province of Alberta operated out of Taber.

See also 
List of school authorities in Alberta

References

External links 

 
School districts in Alberta
Taber, Alberta